Hans Hahne is the name of:

 Hans Hahne (Archaeologist) (1875–1935), German medical doctor and archaeologist
 Hans Hahne (General) (1894–1944), German general